Lee Andrews (born 23 April 1984) is an English former professional footballer who played as a defender.

Playing career
Andrews began his career as a trainee with his local side Carlisle United, turning professional in August 2001 and making his league debut later month in a 2–0 defeat at home to Luton Town. He had spell as a regular in the Carlisle side at right-back, before losing his place. He joined Rochdale on loan in February 2003, before returning to Carlisle and regaining his place in the first team, signing a new two-year contract in May 2004. After playing in a Carlisle side relegated to and promoted from the Football Conference, Andrews joined York City on loan in November 2005 and as Carlisle successfully battled for a second successive promotion, moved to Torquay United, struggling at the opposite end of the table on loan in March 2006.

He was released by Carlisle at the end of the 2005–06 season, and returned to Plainmoor on a permanent basis in June 2006 as one of Ian Atkins' first signings after taking over as manager. Atkins had been manager of Carlisle while Andrews was a trainee there. He was an ever-present for Torquay in the 2006–07 season, which ended with Torquay's relegation to the Conference National. Although offered a new contract with Torquay at the end of the season, he chose to return to the North of England.

In September 2007 he signed for Newcastle Blue Star, moving to Workington in April 2008.

Managerial career
In January 2019, Andrews was appointed manager of Workington following the resignation of Gavin Skelton. He stepped down at the end of the 2018–09 season.

Personal life
Andrews was born in Carlisle, Cumbria. He is now employed as a Facilities Manager for a National rail services provider working within the nuclear industry.

References

External links 

WORKINGTON REDS SURVIVE SCARE IN FA CUP WIN News & Star, 27 September 2010 (Archived)

1984 births
Living people
Footballers from Carlisle, Cumbria
English footballers
English football managers
Association football defenders
Carlisle United F.C. players
Rochdale A.F.C. players
York City F.C. players
Torquay United F.C. players
English Football League players
Newcastle Blue Star F.C. players
Workington A.F.C. players
Workington A.F.C. managers